Novoburnovo (Yañı Burnı) is a rural locality (a village) in Burnovsky Selsoviet, Birsky District, Bashkortostan, Russia. The population was 101 as of 2010. There are 3 streets.

Geography 
Novoburnovo is located 9 km northeast of Birsk (the district's administrative centre) by road. Staroburnovo is the nearest rural locality.

References 

Rural localities in Birsky District